Rice production in Romania plays a fairly important role in food supply in Romania and is cultivated largely for domestic consumption but also for exports. The most important growing areas are located along the Danube River in Ialomița, Brăila, Olt and Dolj counties. In 2009 rice production reached 72,500 metric tons with a yield of 5.62 tons/hectare. According to FAOSTAT in 2008 Romania was ranked sixth in rice production in the EU with 48,917 metric tons, just after Italy, Spain, Greece, Portugal and France.

In Romania rice production began in the 1970s when the president Nicolae Ceauşescu, after visits to China and North Korea, forced peasants and convicts to cultivate and work rice fields located in South-Eastern Romania in Vlădeni commune. The action was supposed to make the country self-sufficient in terms of rice consumption.

The most important investor in rice production in Romania is Riso Scotti Danubio, owned by the Italian company Riso Scotti the largest rice producer in Europe. In the same year production amounted to 30,000 metric tons. Around 60% of the production is intended for internal use and 40% is exported to Slovakia, Czech Republic, Poland, Lithuania, Latvia, Hungary, Serbia, Greece, Bulgaria, Armenia and Moldova. Another important company is Padova Agricultura owned by the Italian company Gruppo Roncato which owns  cultivated with rice in Brăila County. In 2009 the company produced 36,000 metric tons of rice which was mainly exported to Italy and Turkey but also delivered to Riso Scotti. The third largest producer of rice in Romania is also an Italian company, Beg Agricultura which owned  of cultivated rice in Olt County and had a harvest of 6,500 metric tons in 2009.

References

Agriculture in Romania
Romania